Juan Botasso  (23 October 1908 – 5 October 1950) was an Argentine footballer. He played in goal for Argentina in the 1930 FIFA World Cup final on 30 July 1930, which was lost 4–2 to Uruguay.

Botasso (sometimes written Bottaso) started his career in 1927 with Argentino de Quilmes. After playing in the 1930 World Cup he moved to Racing Club de Avellaneda where he played until 1938. Botasso then returned to Argentino de Quilmes who were playing in the Argentine 2nd Division.

References

External links
 
 Boca Juniors vs Racing Club 1931-1938

1908 births
1950 deaths
Argentine footballers
Argentine people of Italian descent
Argentina international footballers
Association football goalkeepers
Racing Club de Avellaneda footballers
1930 FIFA World Cup players
People from Quilmes
Sportspeople from Buenos Aires Province